The Emirates Scout Association is the national Scouting organization of the United Arab Emirates. Scouting was founded in the United Arab Emirates in 1972 and became a member of the World Organization of the Scout Movement in 1977. It has 5,522 members (as of 2011).

Scouting was previously founded in several of the individual emirates prior to unification. Scouting was extant in Sharjah by 1957, and in Umm al-Qiwain prior to 1971.

The national Scout camp is at Sharjah. Scouts participate in regional and world Scouting activities, and are active with other Persian Gulf states training in Wood Badge.

The Scout Motto is Kun Musta'idan or كن مستعداً, translating as Be Prepared in Arabic. The noun for a single Scout is Kashaf or كشاف in Arabic.

See also
 Girl Guides Association of the United Arab Emirates

References 

World Organization of the Scout Movement member organizations
Scouting and Guiding in the United Arab Emirates
Youth organizations established in 1972